Firefly luciferin (also known as beetle luciferin) is the luciferin, or light-emitting compound, used for the firefly (Lampyridae), railroad worm (Phengodidae), starworm (Rhagophthalmidae), and click-beetle (Pyrophorini) bioluminescent systems. It is the substrate of luciferase (EC 1.13.12.7), which is responsible for the characteristic yellow light emission from many firefly species.

As with all other luciferins, oxygen is required to elicit light; however, it has also been found  adenosine triphosphate (ATP) and magnesium are required for light emission.

History
Much of the early work on the chemistry of the firefly luminescence was done in the lab of William D. McElroy at Johns Hopkins University. The luciferin was first isolated and purified in 1949, though it would be several years until a procedure was developed to crystallize the compound in high yield. This, along with the synthesis and structure elucidation, was accomplished by Dr. Emil H. White at the Johns Hopkins University, Department of Chemistry. The procedure was an acid-base extraction, given the carboxylic acid group on the luciferin. The luciferin could be effectively extracted using ethyl acetate at low pH from powder of approximately 15,000 firefly lanterns. The structure was later confirmed by combined use of infrared spectroscopy, UV-vis spectroscopy and synthetic methods to degrade the compound into identifiable fragments.

Properties
Crystal luciferin was found to be fluorescent, absorbing ultraviolet light with a peak at 327 nm and emitting light with a peak at 530 nm. Visible emission occurs upon relaxation of the oxyluciferin from a singlet excited state down to its ground state. Alkaline solutions caused a redshift of the absorption likely due to deprotonation of the hydroxyl group on the benzothiazole, but did not affect the fluorescence emission. It was found that the luciferyl adenylate (the AMP ester of luciferin) spontaneously emits light in solution.
Different species of fireflies all use the same luciferin, however the color of the light emitted can differ greatly. The light from Photuris pennsylvanica was measured to be 552 nm (green-yellow) while Pyrophorus plagiophthalamus was measured to emit light at 582 nm (orange) in the ventral organ. Such differences are likely due to pH changes or differences in primary structure of the luciferase. Modification of the firefly luciferin substrate has led to "red-shifted" emissions (up to emission wavelength of 675 nm).

Biological activity
The in vivo synthesis of firefly luciferin is not completely understood. Only the final step of the enzymatic pathway has been studied, which is the condensation reaction of D-cysteine with 2-cyano-6-hydroxybenzothiazole, and is the same reaction used to produce the compound synthetically. This was confirmed by radiolabeling of atoms in the two compounds and by identification of a luciferin-regenerating enzyme.

In firefly, oxidation of luciferins, which is catalyzed by luciferases, yields a peroxy compound 1,2-dioxetane. The dioxetane is unstable and decays spontaneously to carbon dioxide and excited ketones, which release excess energy by emitting light (bioluminescence).

Firefly luciferin and modified substrates are fatty acid mimics and have been used to localize fatty acid amide hydrolase (FAAH) in vivo. Firefly luciferin is a substrate of the ABCG2 transporter and has been used as part of a bioluminescence imaging high thoroughput assay to screen for inhibitors of the transporter.

References

External links
Bioluminescence Page showing major luciferin types

Benzothiazoles
Bioluminescence
Carboxylic acids
Thiazolines
Luciferins